Capua is a genus of moths belonging to the subfamily Tortricinae of the family Tortricidae.

Species 

Capua aeluropa Meyrick, 1926
Capua arctophaea Meyrick, 1924
Capua aridela Turner, 1918
Capua changi Kawabe, 1989
Capua chloraspis Meyrick, 1924
Capua cirrhanthes Meyrick, 1921
Capua coenotoca Diakonoff, 1983
Capua cornigera Meyrick, 1912
Capua endocypha Meyrick, 1931
Capua euphona Meyrick, 1910
Capua fabrilis Meyrick, 1912
Capua liparochra Meyrick, 1928
Capua lissochrysa Diakonoff, 1976
Capua morosa Diakonoff, 1975
Capua oxycelis Diakonoff, 1983
Capua pantherina (Meyrick, 1908)
Capua reclina Razowski, 1978
Capua repentina Razowski, 1978
Capua retractana (Walker, 1863)
Capua semiferana (Walker, 1863)
Capua spilonoma Meyrick, 1932
Capua thelmae Diakonoff, 1968
Capua vulgana (Frolich, 1828)
Capua zapyrrha Meyrick, 1936

See also 
 List of Tortricidae genera

References 

 Brown, J. W. (2005). World Catalogue of Insects. 5 Tortricidae
 Diakonoff, A. (1968). "Microlepidoptera of the Philippine Islands". United States National Museum Bulletin. 257: 7–100, 300–337, 414–425.
 Meyrick, E. (1921). "New Micro-Lepidoptera". Zoologische Mededelingen. 7: 145–201.

External links 
 Tortricid.net

 
Archipini
Tortricidae genera
Taxa named by James Francis Stephens